Henri-Jean Martin (16 January 1924 – 13 January 2007) was a leading authority on the history of the book in Europe, and an expert on the history of writing and  printing. He was a leader in efforts to promote libraries in France, and the history of libraries and printing.

Born in Paris, Henri-Jean Martin's initial professional position was that of conservateur in the réserve des imprimés of the Bibliothèque nationale, a position he held from 1947 to 1958. In 1958 he published his famous work, L'Apparition du Livre (The Coming of the Book), which he co-authored with the French historian Lucien Febvre. In 1962 he was named conservateur en chef of the Bibliothèque municipale de Lyon. With master printer Marius Audin he helped create Lyon's Musée de l’Imprimerie. In 1970 he left Lyon for Paris, and a chair of bibliography the history of the book at the École Nationale des Chartes, where he taught until 1993. In 1998 he was awarded the Gutenberg Prize of the International Gutenberg Society and the City of Mainz.

Henri-Jean Martin also taught at the École Nationale Supérieure des Bibliothèques (ENSB, in Paris, today the Ecole Nationale Supérieure des Science de l'Information et des Bibliothèques / ENSSIB in Lyon), and at the École pratique des hautes études where he served thirty years as a directeur des études in the IV° section.

He died in Paris of cancer.

Selected bibliography 
The author is Henri-Jean Martin unless indicated otherwise.

  Series : Itinéraires du savoir.
 
  preface by Roger Chartier ; Series : Titre courant, 1420-5254, 14-15 ; Note : "Ce livre a d'abord paru en 1969 dans la collection Histoire et civilisation du livre." See also: (1969) (same title and publisher, no ISBN) Series : Histoire et civilisation du livre, 3 ; Note : "Publications du Centre de recherches d'histoire et de philologie de la IVe section de l'École pratique des hautes études, Paris." Originally presented as the author's thesis, Paris. 
  tr. by David Gerard ; ed. by Geoffrey Nowell-Smith and David Wootton ; Note : reprint, other reprints by this publisher 1990 & 1984, originally published (London : N.L.B., 1976) ; Translation of L'apparition du livre.
  Series : Johns Hopkins symposia in comparative history, 22nd.
  tr. by Lydia G. Cochrane. 
  tr. by David Gerard ; Note : Translation of Livre, pouvoirs et société à Paris au 17e siècle. Originally presented as the author's thesis, Paris.  
  4 volumes.
  Series : Histoire et décadence, ISSN 0291-3852 ; preface by Pierre Chaunu. 
  Series : Histoire du livre.
  Series : Lezioni della Scuola di studi superiori in Napoli, 8.
  4 volumes.
  tr. by David Gerard ; ed. by Geoffrey Nowell-Smith and David Wootton ; Series : Foundations of history library ; Note: Translation of L'apparition du livre
  Series : L'évolution de l'humanité no. 30; Note : Previously published as v.49 of the Bibliothèque de synthèse historique "L'evolution de l'humanite".

See also 
Historiography
List of historians by name

Notes

External links 
Obituary by Roger Chartier
Obituary in The Independent, 9 February 2007
 Frédéric Barbier, « Henri-Jean Martin, ou qu’est-ce que l’histoire du livre ? », in Préfaces, n° 17, February – March 1990, pp106–12.

1924 births
Scientists from Paris
2007 deaths
École Nationale des Chartes alumni
Academic staff of the École Nationale des Chartes
Academic staff of the École pratique des hautes études
French librarians
Deaths from cancer in France
Chevaliers of the Légion d'honneur
20th-century French historians